This is the discography of Daz Dillinger, an American rapper and record producer. 

Daz Dillinger sold over 1 million albums in the U.S. and over 1.2 million worldwide solo. With Dogg Pound he sold over 4 million copies in the U.S.

Albums

Studio albums

Compilation albums

Collaboration albums

EPs

Instrumental albums

Mixtapes
DPG: Till The Day I Die Mixtape (2004)
So So Gangsta - The Mixtape (2005)
West Coast Gangstas - Starring: Tha Dogg Pound (Hosted by DJ Kurupt) (2005)
Dillinger & Makaveli - Tribute: Streetz of LA Special Edition (Hosted by DJ Nik Bean) (2009)
Dilly Tha Dogg - Bacc 2 Tha Old School Vol. 1 (2013)

With Tha Dogg Pound

Singles

Solo singles

As featured artist

Collaborative singles

Guest appearances

References 

Dillinger, Daz

Discographies of American artists